Henry Howard Rose (1856–1923) was the 29th Mayor of Los Angeles from July 1913 to July 1915. He only served for one term. He was regarded as "anti- [trade] unionist". He was at first against the Mulholland annexation proposal but, after taking office, he switched positions.

According to the Los Angeles Times, Rose was: "[a] socialist and progressive, Rose was also a crack pistol shot, winning many matches, even against the police chief."

References

Mayors of Los Angeles
Place of death missing
1856 births
1923 deaths